Reagan's War is a 2002 book by Peter Schweizer.

Synopsis 
The book covers Ronald Reagan's actions during the Cold War, and credits him with the eventual end of the Cold War.

Reception 
The book received mixed reviews. Publishers Weekly praised Schweizer's writing style, while criticizing the book's hagiographical approach to history. Walter Russell Mead gave the book a positive review in The Washington Post. Kirkus Reviews called the book a "tendentious and extremely partisan account" of Reagan's presidency and the Cold War. The book was later adapted into a film titled In the Face of Evil: Reagan's War in Word and Deed.

References

Political books
Books about Ronald Reagan
Books about the Cold War
2002 non-fiction books
Doubleday (publisher) books
Non-fiction books adapted into films